Hatillo Palma is a town in the Monte Cristi province of the Dominican Republic.

References

Populated places in Monte Cristi Province